The William Baskin House, at 811 W. Quay Avenue in Artesia, New Mexico, was listed on the National Register of Historic Places in 1984.

It is a two-story hipped roof house built of artificial stone in 1905, and is one of the oldest surviving buildings in Artesia.

It is one of ten houses of cast-stone construction which were together listed on the National Register in 1983.

See also
Baskin Building, also NRHP-listed in Artesia

References

National Register of Historic Places in Eddy County, New Mexico
Houses completed in 1905
1905 establishments in New Mexico Territory